Longue Vue may refer to:

Places
 Longue Vue Island, Thousand Islands, Saint-Lawrence River, New York State, USA
 Longue Vue Club and Golf Course, Penn Hills Township, Allegheny County, Pennsylvania, USA
 Longue Vue House and Gardens (aka "Longue Vue"), Lakewood, New Orleans, Louisiana, USA; an NRHP-listed site
 Longue Vue Manor, Clayton, Jefferson County, New York State, USA
 Longue Vue (estate), Hastings-on-Hudson, New York State, USA; the country home of William Howard Hoople
 Mont Longue-Vue, La Trinité-des-Monts municipality, Rimouski-Neigette Regional County Municipality, Bas-Saint-Laurent region, Quebec, Canada; a mountain and the source of the Brisson River (Rimouski River tributary)

Literature
 Longue Vue (magazine), a magazine founded by Lélia Wanick Salgado
 La Longue-vue (1983), a work by Frédéric Musso
 Longue Vue (1993), a tale by Amélie Nothomb

Other uses
 telescope (longue-vue), in 19th-century ship's nautical parlance

See also

 

 Vue (disambiguation)
 Longview (disambiguation)